Nadia Reid (born 26 August 1991) is a singer-songwriter and guitarist from Port Chalmers, New Zealand. She has been acclaimed for her intimate musical soundscape and unique voice, and has been described by The Guardian as "an understated, wise guide through uncertain territory" and by Revue as "allegorical and often brutally honest". Her three albums, Listen to Formation, Look for the Signs (2015), Preservation (2017), and Out of My Province (2020), have received acclaim in New Zealand and internationally.

Reid performs live with a regular band of musicians consisting of Sam Taylor (guitar), Richie Pickard (bass), and Joe McCallum (drums).

Early life
Born in Devonport, New Zealand, Reid is the daughter of Karin Reid and Craig O’Reilly. She was educated at Logan Park High School and Queen's High School. Reid began playing the guitar at 14, and went on to win best female musician in the Smokefreerockquest. She was a member of the Queen's madrigal choir, who won the New Zealand Choral Federation Millennium Trophy (Otago) for secondary school choirs in 2009.

Career
At the age of 18, Reid moved to Christchurch. She released several EPs and began performing her original songs. Several short EPs followed, and as opportunities to perform nationally arose she moved to Auckland, and then Wellington.

2014–2016: Crowdfunding and release of debut album
Reid was encouraged to work toward her first full-length album and was already connected to Lyttelton-based producer Ben Edwards. Without startup capital, Reid set up a PledgeMe campaign, which was given a significant boost after she opened for Tiny Ruins.

This gave her a footing to record and self-release Listen to Formation, Look for the Signs at Edwards' Sitting Rooms Studios. In early 2015, Reid was signed to Australian indie label Spunk Records and the album was released officially in Australia and New Zealand. Listen to Formation, Look for the Signs was warmly received by critics, and in 2016 was nominated for a Tui award for best folk album and for the Taite Music Prize.

After a period living and playing shows in Australia, Reid returned home to Port Chalmers and began an English Degree at the University of Otago.

Listen to Formation, Look for the Signs was quickly licensed for UK, US and European release, which opened the door to Reid’s first tour of the UK and Europe in 2016.

2017–present: World tours and second album
Before leaving the country for the tour, Reid returned to the Lyttleton studio with Ben Edwards and her backing band where they recorded her sophomore album Preservation.

The tour was a success, and while in London, Reid was approached with a co-management offer with Melodic Records. This was followed by a publishing deal with Basin Rock Records and an endorsement from Crafter Guitars. Since its release on 3 March 2017, Preservation has been met with a positive reception.

Reid opened for Ryan Adams at his sold-out Auckland show on 20 May 2017.

Awards
Reid’s first single from ‘’Preservation’’, Richard, saw her nominated for the APRA Silver Scroll award in 2017, regarded as New Zealand’s most important songwriting award. Judges described the song as "a stand-out folk-rock gem with its wonderfully direct delivery, charting heartbreak and dissolution, through striking imagery".

Also in 2017, producer Ben Edwards won a New Zealand Music Award for his work on Preservation, and Reid herself was nominated for Best Solo Artist, Breakthrough Artist of the Year and Best Alternative Artist.

Film and television appearances
On 26 September 2017, Reid made her UK television debut with her band, appearing on Later... with Jools Holland on BBC Two.

Discography

Studio albums

Extended plays

Singles

Other charted songs

Notes

References

External links
 

1991 births
21st-century New Zealand women singers
Living people
New Zealand folk musicians
New Zealand women singer-songwriters
Musicians from Dunedin
People from Port Chalmers
Spacebomb Records artists